Diano d'Alba is a comune (municipality) in the Province of Cuneo in the Italian region Piedmont, located about  southeast of Turin and about  northeast of Cuneo.

Diano d'Alba borders the following municipalities: Alba, Benevello, Grinzane Cavour, Montelupo Albese, Rodello and Serralunga d'Alba.

Twin towns — sister cities
Diano d'Alba is twinned with:

  Diano Marina, Italy, since 2007
  Néoules, France, since 2007
  Dolegna del Collio, Italy, since 2007

References

Cities and towns in Piedmont